The Arundel Formation, also known as the Arundel Clay, is a clay-rich sedimentary rock formation, within the Potomac Group, found in Maryland  of the United States of America.  It is of Aptian age (Lower Cretaceous). This rock unit had been economically important as a source of iron ore, but is now more notable for its dinosaur fossils. It consists of clay lenses within depressions in the upper part of the Patuxent Formation that may represent oxbow swamp facies. It is named for Anne Arundel County, Maryland.

Vertebrate paleofauna

Dinosaurs
Dinosaurs present include cf. Acrocanthosaurus, the possible ornithischian Magulodon, the poorly known theropods "Allosaurus" medius, "Creosaurus" potens, and "Coelurus" gracilis, the ornithomimosaurian "Dryosaurus" grandis, as well as another indeterminate ornithomimosaurian (though it most likely is Nedcolbertia), the sauropod Astrodon, the nodosaurid Priconodon, a possible basal ceratopsian, and potentially the ornithopod Tenontosaurus. Other vertebrates are not as well known from the formation, but include a freshwater shark, a lungfish, at least three genera of turtles, and at least one crocodilian.

Pterosaurs
Unassigned pteradactyloid tracks.

Other fossils
William Bullock Clark (1897) described lignitized trunks of trees often found in upright positions with their roots still intact.

G. J. Brenner (1963) described spores and pollen within the formation.

See also

 List of dinosaur-bearing rock formations

Footnotes

References
 Weishampel, David B.; Dodson, Peter; and Osmólska, Halszka (eds.): The Dinosauria, 2nd, Berkeley: University of California Press. 861 pp. .

External links 

Lower Cretaceous Series of North America
Cretaceous Maryland
Natural history of Maryland
Paleontology in Maryland
Cretaceous Washington, D.C.
Aptian Stage